Thomas M. Fitzpatrick (January 21, 1891 – June 24, 1986) was an American football and basketball player, coach of football, basketball, and baseball, and football official.  He served as the head football coach at the University of Utah from 1919 to 1924, compiling a record of 23–17–3. From 1917 to 1925, he was the coach of the Utah men's basketball team; his teams had a cumulative record of 42–30.  Fitzpatrick was also the head baseball coach at Utah from 1918 to 1921, tallying a mark of 14–8.

Fitzpatrick was a native of Montana.  After leaving Utah, he moved to Oakland, California to coach high school sports.  There he coached football, basketball, and baseball at Roosevelt High School from 1926 to 1944 and at McClymonds High School from 1945 to 1956.  He also officiated 12 Rose Bowls, including the 1929 Rose Bowl, famous for Roy Riegels's wrong-way run.  Fitzpatrick died on June 24, 1986 at the age of 95. He had been a resident of Aptos, California since 1962.

Head coaching record

College football

References

1891 births
1986 deaths
American men's basketball players
Baseball coaches from California
Baseball coaches from Montana
Basketball coaches from California
Basketball coaches from Montana
Basketball players from Oakland, California
Basketball players from Montana
Coaches of American football from California
Coaches of American football from Montana
Players of American football from Oakland, California
Players of American football from Montana
Utah Utes baseball coaches
Utah Utes football coaches
Utah Utes football players
Utah Utes men's basketball coaches
Utah Utes men's basketball players
College football officials
High school baseball coaches in the United States
High school basketball coaches in California
High school football coaches in California
People from Aptos, California